A studio school is a type of specialist secondary school in England that is designed to give students practical skills in workplace environments as well as traditional academic and vocational courses of study. Like traditional schools, studio schools teach the National Curriculum and offer academic and vocational qualifications. However, studio schools also have links to local employers and offer education related to the world of work. Twenty studio schools will have closed by the summer of 2018; the introduction of studio schools has been widely criticised .  A comprehensive account of the initiative describes how it hit political and financial obstacles.

Description
Studio schools are a type of Free School, introduced in 2010.  They are part of the Academies Programme, and are funded by the taxpayer, non-selective, free to attend and not controlled by a local education authority. While this is also true of most other academies and free schools, studio schools are collectively distinctive in a number of ways. Studio schools are sponsored by existing schools, colleges, and community groups. However, existing schools cannot convert to become a studio school - all studio schools have to be stand alone schools with no direct transfer intake of pupils. Studio schools are designed to be small, with a maximum of 300 students, which enables them to foster a supportive, personalised learning environment with a strong focus on pastoral care. The schools forge close links with businesses and enterprises in their specialist industries who support the schools through activities such as mentoring, work placements, and curriculum design and delivery. To further prepare students for the world of work, employability skills are embedded throughout all school activities using the CREATE employability skills framework.

Like University Technical Colleges, studio schools are designed for students aged 14–19, whereas free schools and other academies can choose the age range of their pupils. Some studio schools, which operate in areas with a three-tier school system, have intakes for students aged 13.

The name 'Studio School' is derived from the concept of the Renaissance studio which existed in Europe from 1400 to 1700. Students at these studios were taught by an experienced master in the same place in which the master created and produced his work. Modern-day studio schools aim to give students skills required by employers and businesses in the local area, in an environment which simulates genuine workplaces. As part of this, studio schools are open all year round and have a longer school day, typically 9am to 5pm.

The Studio Schools programme as a whole is overseen by the Studio Schools Trust, who are responsible for helping in the establishment of new studio schools, and supporting existing schools to implement the model. Part of this work involves facilitating the sharing of best practice through networking sessions and training and CPD events. Businesses involved with the Studio Schools programme include National Space Centre, TalkTalk, Barclays, National Nuclear Laboratory, and National Trust.

History
The establishment of studio schools has been criticised by some teaching unions, who claim they will cause further fragmentation state school provision. The age intake range of studio schools have also been criticised, with some unions arguing that 14 is too early an age for most children to receive such a specialised education.

In March 2016, it emerged that of the forty-seven studio schools that had been established, fourteen had closed or were closing. Six new studio schools were scheduled to open. By April 2018, nineteen schools had closed at a cost estimated at £48m, with another due to close in the summer. Free schools, introduced in 2010, include studio schools and university technical colleges; sixty-six free schools had closed by April 2018, at an estimated cost of almost £150m in startup costs and capital funding. The joint general secretary of the National Education Union (NEU) said "The government should hang its head in shame at this monumental waste of taxpayers’ money at a time when schools are severely underfunded".

In 2017, academies minister Lord Nash conducted an informal review of the studio schools concept due to low pupil recruitment and closures.  Significant additional funding was provided in 2017 to cover losses at the University Technical Colleges, which had been started by former Conservative Minister Kenneth Baker, but no comparable support was provided for studio schools. 
As of 2018, almost half of the Studio Schools so far started, twenty-seven of fifty-six, had closed or were closing.

List of studio schools

See also
University Technical College
Academy (English school)
Free school (England)
Polytechnic
Maths school

References

External links
 Studio School Trust homepage
 TED Talk. Geoff Mulgan: A short intro to the Studio School

Education in England
School types
State schools in the United Kingdom